Greg Rucka is an American writer known for the series of novels starring his character Atticus Kodiak, the creator-owned comic book series Whiteout, Queen & Country, Stumptown and Lazarus, as well as lengthy runs on such titles as Detective Comics, Wonder Woman, Elektra and Wolverine. Rucka has written a substantial amount of supplemental material for a number of DC Comics' line-wide and inter-title crossovers, including "No Man's Land", "Infinite Crisis" and "New Krypton". Rucka has also co-created, along with writer Ed Brubaker and artist Michael Lark, the acclaimed comic book series Gotham Central, which takes the perspective of ordinary policemen working in Gotham City.

Novels

Atticus Kodiak
Series of novels starring the professional bodyguard Atticus Kodiak, including:
Keeper (hc, 275 pages, Bantam Books, 1996, ; sc, 332 pages, 1997)
Finder (hc, 288 pages, Bantam Books, 1997, ; sc, 352 pages, 1998)
Smoker (hc, 320 pages, Bantam Books, 1998, ; sc, 432 pages, 1999)
Shooting at Midnight (hc, 368 pages, Bantam Books, 1999, ; sc, 400 pages, 2000)
Critical Space (hc, 440 pages, Bantam Books, 2002, ; sc, 528 pages, 2003)
Patriot Acts (hc, 352 pages, Bantam Books, 2007, ; sc, 416 pages, 2008)
Walking Dead (hc, 320 pages, Bantam Books, 2009, ; sc, 400 pages, 2010)

Other early work
Novelizations, original stories within established franchises and other work, including:
Batman: No Man's Land (hc, 448 pages, Pocket Books, 2000)
Grendel: Past Prime (sc, 208 pages, Dark Horse Books, 2000)
Buffy the Vampire Slayer: Tales of the Slayer Volume 1: "A Good Run" (anthology sc, 280 pages, Simon Spotlight, 2001)
A Fistful of Rain (hc, 320 pages, Bantam Books, 2003, ; sc, 400 pages, 2004)

Queen & Country
Series of novels set in the world of Rucka's comic book series Queen & Country, including:
A Gentleman's Game (hc, 352 pages, Bantam Books, 2004, ; sc, 528 pages, 2005)
Private Wars (hc, 432 pages, Bantam Books, 2005, ; sc, 544 pages, 2006)
The Last Run (hc, 272 pages, Bantam Books, 2010, ; sc, 352 pages, 2011)

Perfect Dark
Series of novels set in the world of the Perfect Dark video game, including:
Perfect Dark: Initial Vector (sc, 352 pages, Tor Books, 2005)
Perfect Dark: Second Front (sc, 368 pages, Tor Books, 2007)

Jad Bell
Series of novels starring the ex-Delta Force operative Jad Bell, including:
Alpha (hc, 304 pages, Mulholland Books, 2012, ; sc, 368 pages, 2015)
Bravo (hc, 304 pages, Mulholland Books, 2014, ; sc, 368 pages, 2015)

Star Wars
Series of young adult novels set in the current canon of Star Wars, including:
Star Wars: Smuggler's Run (hc, 192 pages, Lucasfilm Press, 2015)
Star Wars: Before the Awakening (hc, 224 pages, Lucasfilm Press, 2015)
Star Wars: Guardians of the Whills (hc, 240 pages, Lucasfilm Press, 2017)

Comics

Oni Press
Titles published by Oni Press include:
Whiteout (with Steve Lieber):
Whiteout Compendium (tpb, 240 pages, 2017) collects:
 Whiteout #1–4 (1998) also collected as Whiteout (tpb, 128 pages, 1999)
 Whiteout: Melt #1–4 (1999–2000) also collected as Whiteout: Melt (tpb, 120 pages, 2000)
Whiteout: Night (initially announced for late 2007 as Whiteout: Thaw; reportedly moved closer to the release of the film adaptation)
 In 2009, Lieber stated there was only one completed issue so far. In a 2012 interview, Rucka mentioned "one and a half" completed issues.
Oni Press Color Special '00: "Weenout" (a Barry Ween/Whiteout crossover co-written by Rucka and Judd Winick, art by Winick, anthology, 2000)
Queen & Country:
The Definitive Edition Volume 1 (tpb, 376 pages, 2007) collects:
 Oni Press Color Special '01: "Broken Ground" (with Stan Sakai, anthology, 2001)
 "Operation: Broken Ground" (with Steve Rolston, in #1–4, 2001)
 "Operation: Morningstar" (with Brian Hurtt, in #5–7, 2002)
 "Operation: Crystal Ball" (with Leandro Fernández, in #8–12, 2002)
The Definitive Edition Volume 2 (tpb, 344 pages, 2008) collects:
 "Operation: Blackwall" (with Jason Shawn Alexander, in #13–15, 2003)
 "Operation: Stormfront" (with Carla Speed McNeil, in #16–20, 2003)
 "Operation: Dandelion" (with Mike Hawthorne, in #21–24, 2003–2004)
The Definitive Edition Volume 3 (tpb, 408 pages, 2008) collects:
 "Untitled" (with Steve Rolston, in #25, 2004)
 "Operation: Saddlebags" (with Mike Norton, in #26–28, 2004)
 "Operation: Red Panda" (with Chris Samnee, in #29–32, 2006–2007)
The Definitive Edition Volume 4 (tpb, 296 pages, 2009) collects:
 Queen & Country: Declassified #1–3 (with Brian Hurtt, 2002–2003)
 Queen & Country: Declassified vol. 2 #1–3 (with Rick Burchett, 2005–2006)
 Queen & Country: Declassified vol. 3 #1–3 (written by Antony Johnston, drawn by Christopher Mitten, 2005)
Everest: Facing the Goddess (with Scott Morse, 12-issue maxi-series initially announced for August 2004)
 A 7-page sketch preview was published in the Free Comic Book Day 2004: Love Fights special.
 Rucka has stated he's still interested in producing the series as recently as December 2011.
Stumptown:
Stumptown #1–4 (with Matthew Southworth, 2009–2010) collected as Stumptown: The Case of the Girl Who Took Her Shampoo but Left Her Mini (hc, 144 pages, 2011, ; tpb, 2017)
Stumptown vol. 2 #1–5 (with Matthew Southworth, 2012–2013) collected as Stumptown: The Case of the Baby in the Velvet Case (hc, 152 pages, 2013, ; tpb, 2018)
Stumptown vol. 3 (with Justin Greenwood, 2014–2016) collected as:
 The Case of the King of Clubs (collects #1–5, hc, 144 pages, 2015, ; tpb, 2018)
 The Case of a Cup of Joe (collects #6–10, hc, 152 pages, 2016, ; tpb, 2019)

DC Comics
Titles published by DC Comics include:
Batman:
The Batman Chronicles (anthology):
 "Random Encounters" (with Sal Buscema, in #14, 1998) collected in Batman: Road to No Man's Land Volume 1 (tpb, 288 pages, 2015)
 "An Answer in the Rubble" (with Roger Cruz, in #15, 1998) collected in Batman: Road to No Man's Land Volume 2 (tpb, 200 pages, 2016)
Batman: No Man's Land:
 Volume 1 (tpb, 544 pages, 2011) includes:
 Batman #565 + Detective Comics #732: "Mosaic" (with Frank Teran, 1999)
 The Batman Chronicles #16: "Two Down" (with Jason Pearson, anthology, 1999)
 Batman: Legends of the Dark Knight #118: "Balance" (with Jason Pearson, 1999)
 Volume 2 (tpb, 512 pages, 2012) includes:
 Batman: Legends of the Dark Knight #119 + Batman: Shadow of the Bat #87: "Claim Jumping" (with Mike Deodato, Jr., 1999)
 Batman: Legends of the Dark Knight #120: "Assembly" (with Mike Deodato, Jr., 1999)
 Batman: Shadow of the Bat #88 + Batman #568 + Detective Comics #735: "Fruit of the Earth" (with Dan Jurgens, 1999)
 Secret Origins of Super-Villains 80-Page Giant: "Echoes Past" (with Rick Burchett, anthology one-shot, 1999)
 Volume 4 (tpb, 552 pages, 2012) includes:
 Batman #572 + Detective Comics #739: "Jurisprudence" (with Damion Scott, 1999)
 Batman: Legends of the Dark Knight #125: "Falling Back" (with Rick Burchett, 1999)
 Batman: Shadow of the Bat #93: "Assembly Redux" (with Paul Ryan, 1999)
 Batman: No Man's Land #0: "Ground Zero" (co-written by Rucka and Jordan B. Gorfinkel, art by Greg Land, 1999)
 Batman #573 + Detective Comics #740: "Shellgame" (with Sergio Cariello, 1999)
 Batman: Legends of the Dark Knight #126 + Batman #574 + Detective Comics #741: "Endgame" (co-written by Rucka and Devin K. Grayson, art by Dale Eaglesham and Damion Scott, 1999)
 Batman: Shadow of the Bat #94: "Endgame (epilogue): Days of Auld Lang Syne" (with Pablo Raimondi, 1999)
Detective Comics (with Shawn Martinbrough, John Watkiss (#745–746), Will Rosado (#747), Phil Hester (#748–749), Brad Rader + Steve Mannion (#753), Koi Turnbull (#756), Rick Burchett (#757, 762, 765, 775), Scott McDaniel (#766), Steve Lieber (#767–771, 773–774) and Sergio Cariello (#772), 2000–2002; with J. H. Williams III (#854–860), Jock (#861–863) and Scott Kolins (#863), 2009–2010) collected as:
 Batman: New Gotham Volume 1 (collects #742–753, tpb, 336 pages, 2017)
 Batman: New Gotham Volume 2 (collects #755–765, tpb, 296 pages, 2018)
 Batman: Bruce Wayne — Murderer? (includes #766–770, tpb, 624 pages, 2014)
 Includes the Batman: The 10-Cent Adventure one-shot (written by Rucka, art by Rick Burchett, 2002)
 Batman: Bruce Wayne — Fugitive (includes #771–775, tpb, 432 pages, 2014)
 Batwoman by Greg Rucka and J. H. Williams III (collects #854–863, tpb, 256 pages, 2017)
Batman/Huntress: Cry for Blood #1–6 (with Rick Burchett, 2000) collected as Batman/Huntress: Cry for Blood (tpb, 144 pages, 2002)
Batman: Turning Points #1 (with Steve Lieber) and #5 (with Paul Pope, 2001) collected in Batman: Turning Points (tpb, 128 pages, 2007)
Batman: Officer Down (tpb, 168 pages, 2001) includes:
 Batman #587: "Part One: These are Your Rights" (with Rick Burchett, 2001)
 Batman: Gotham Knights #13: "Part Seven: The End" (with Rick Burchett, 2001)
Gotham Central (with Michael Lark, Greg Scott (#17–18), Stefano Gaudiano (#28–31), Steve Lieber (#32 and 37) and Kano, 2003–2006) collected as:
 Issues #1–2, 12–15 and 33–36 are co-written by Rucka and Ed Brubaker.
 In the Line of Duty (includes #1–2 and 6–10, hc, 240 pages, 2008, ; tpb, 2011)
 Jokers and Madmen (includes #12–15 and 17–18, hc, 288 pages, 2009, ; tpb, 2011)
 On the Freak Beat (includes #23–25 and 28–31, hc, 224 pages, 2010, ; tpb, 2011)
 Corrigan (collects #32–40, hc, 224 pages, 2011, ; tpb, 2012)
 Omnibus (includes #1–2, 6–10, 12–15, 17–18, 23–25, 28–40, hc, 957 pages, 2016)
Batman: Death and the Maidens (tpb, 224 pages, 2004, ; hc, 240 pages, 2017) collects:
 Detective Comics #783: "Death and the Maidens: Prologue" (with Klaus Janson, co-feature, 2003)
 Batman: Death and the Maidens #1–9 (with Klaus Janson, 2003–2004)
DCU Infinite Holiday Special: "Lights" (with Christian Alamy, anthology one-shot, 2007)
Detective Comics #1027: "Rookie" (with Eduardo Risso, co-feature, 2020)
Flinch #8: "Guts" (with James Romberger, anthology, Vertigo, 1999) collected in Flinch Book One (tpb, 192 pages, 2015)
Weird War Tales Special: "Esprit de Corps" (with Danijel Žeželj, anthology one-shot, Vertigo, 2000)
Weird Western Tales vol. 2 #1: "This Gun for Hire" (with Rick Burchett, anthology, Vertigo, 2001)
Superman:
Superman: President Lex (tpb, 240 pages, 2003) includes:
 President Luthor Secret Files & Origins (co-features in one-shot, 2001):
 "The Why" (with Matthew Clark)
 "Most Suitable Person" (with Dale Eaglesham)
 Superman: Lex 2000: "One or the Other" (with Dwayne Turner, co-feature in one-shot, 2000)
Adventures of Superman (with Matthew Clark, Renato Guedes, Paul Pelletier (#632), Rags Morales (#636) and Karl Kerschl, 2004–2006) collected as:
 Superman: Unconventional Warfare (collects #627–632 and co-features from #625–626, tpb, 160 pages, 2005)
 Superman: That Healing Touch (collects #633–638, tpb, 168 pages, 2005)
 Superman: Ruin Revealed (collects #640–641 and 644–647, tpb, 144 pages, 2006)
 Issues #642–643 are collected in Superman: Sacrifice (tpb, 192 pages, 2006)
 Issues #644–645 and 647 are scripted by Nunzio DeFilippis and Christina Weir from Rucka's plots.
 Issue #648, also scripted by DeFilippis and Weir from a story by Rucka, remains uncollected.
Superman Secret Files 2004: "Pipolar Reorder" (with Jon Bogdanove, co-feature in one-shot, 2004)
Supergirl vol. 4 #6: "Candor, Part One" (with Ed Benes, 2006) collected in Supergirl: The Girl of Steel (tpb, 304 pages, 2016)
 Rucka joined the series as the new regular writer, but left after one full issue. Issue #7 is scripted by Joe Kelly from Rucka's plot for "Candor".
 Solicitations for Rucka-written issues #7 and 8 (resolicited twice before Kelly was named as the new writer) are still available online.
Action Comics (with Eddy Barrows, Sidney Teles (#876–877), Diego Olmos (#878–879), Julian López (#880) and Pere Pérez, 2009–2010) collected as:
 Superman: Nightwing and Flamebird Volume 1 (collects #875–879 and Annual #12, hc, 168 pages, 2010, ; tpb, 2011)
 Superman: Codename Patriot (includes #880, hc, 144 pages, 2010, ; tpb, 2011)
 Issue #880 is co-written by Rucka and James Robinson.
 Supergirl: The Hunt for Reactron (includes #881–882 and Supergirl vol. 4 #45–46, tpb, 304 pages, 2019)
 Includes the "Blood-Sisters" short story (co-written by Rucka and Sterling Gates, art by Fernando Dagnino) from Superman Secret Files 2009 (one-shot, 2009)
 All issues of "The Hunt for Reactron" crossover — Action Comics #881–882 and Supergirl vol. 4 #45–46 — are co-written by Rucka and Sterling Gates.
 Superman: Nightwing and Flamebird Volume 2 (collects #883–889, hc, 208 pages, 2011, ; tpb, 2011)
 Issues #883–889 are co-written by Rucka and Eric Trautmann.
Superman: World of New Krypton (co-written by Rucka and James Robinson, art by Pete Woods, 2009–2010) collected as:
 Superman: New Krypton Volume 3 (collects #1–5, hc, 144 pages, 2010, ; tpb, 2011)
 Superman: New Krypton Volume 4 (collects #6–12, hc, 192 pages, 2010, ; tpb, 2011)
Superman Secret Files 2009: "Vigil" (with Pere Pérez, co-feature in one-shot, 2009)
Superman: Heroes (co-written by Rucka, Brian Michael Bendis and Matt Fraction, art by various artists, one-shot, 2020) collected in Superman: The Truth Revealed (hc, 192 pages, 2020, ; tpb, 2021)
Wonder Woman:
Wonder Woman: The Hiketeia (with J. G. Jones, graphic novel, hc, 96 pages, 2002, ; sc, 2003)
Wonder Woman vol. 2 (with Drew Johnson, Shane Davis (#201), Stephen Sadowski (#202), Sean Phillips (#211), James Raiz (#212–213), Rags Morales, Ron Randall (#218), David López (#220) and Cliff Richards, 2003–2006) collected as:
 Wonder Woman by Greg Rucka Volume 1 (collects #195–205, tpb, 392 pages, 2016)
 Wonder Woman by Greg Rucka Volume 2 (collects #206–217, tpb, 320 pages, 2017)
 Wonder Woman by Greg Rucka Volume 3 (collects #218–226, tpb, 216 pages, 2019)
 Includes the 3-issue limited series Blackest Night: Wonder Woman (written by Rucka, art by Nicola Scott, 2010)
Wonder Woman: Earth One (with J. H. Williams III, unproduced graphic novel — the project was apparently "promised" to Rucka by Dan Didio before being given to Grant Morrison)
Wonder Woman vol. 5 (with Liam Sharp, Nicola Scott, Bilquis Evely, Renato Guedes (#13) and Mirka Andolfo (#22), 2016–2017) collected as:
 Wonder Woman Rebirth: The Deluxe Edition Book One (collects #1–14, hc, 304 pages, 2017)
 Includes the Wonder Woman: Rebirth one-shot (written by Rucka, art by Matthew Clark, 2016)
 Wonder Woman Rebirth: The Deluxe Edition Book Two (collects the #15–25 and Annual #1, hc, 296 pages, 2018)
 Includes the "Solstice" short story (art by Bilquis Evely) from DC Universe Holiday Special (one-shot, 2018)
Wonder Woman 75th Anniversary Special: "Wonder Woman in Conversation" (with Liam Sharp, anthology, 2016)
Wonder Woman #750: "Never Change" (with Nicola Scott, co-feature, 2020) collected in Wonder Woman: The Four Horsewomen (tpb, 336 pages, 2021)
Infinite Crisis Omnibus (hc, 1,152 pages, 2012) includes:
Countdown to Infinite Crisis (co-written by Rucka, Judd Winick and Geoff Johns, art by Rags Morales, Ed Benes, Jesús Saiz, Ivan Reis and Phil Jimenez, one-shot, 2005)
The OMAC Project #1–6 (with Jesús Saíz and Cliff Richards, 2005) also collected as The OMAC Project (tpb, 256 pages, 2005)
Infinite Crisis Special: The OMAC Project (with Jesús Saíz, 2006) also collected in Infinite Crisis Companion (tpb, 168 pages, 2006)
52 (co-written by Rucka, Geoff Johns, Grant Morrison and Mark Waid, art by various artists from layouts by Keith Giffen, 2006–2007) collected as:
Volume 1 (collects #1–13, tpb, 304 pages, 2007)
Volume 2 (collects #14–26, tpb, 304 pages, 2007)
Volume 3 (collects #27–39, tpb, 304 pages, 2007)
Volume 4 (collects #40–52, tpb, 326 pages, 2007)
Omnibus (collects #1–52, hc, 1,216 pages, 2012)
Checkmate vol. 2 (with Jesús Saíz, Cliff Richards, Steve Scott (#11–12), Joe Bennett and Chris Samnee (#17, 21–22), 2006–2008) collected as:
Checkmate by Greg Rucka Book One (collects #1–12, tpb, 296 pages, 2017)
 Issues #6–7 and 11–12 are co-written by Rucka with Nunzio DeFilippis and Christina Weir.
Checkmate by Greg Rucka Book Two (collects #13–25 and The Outsiders vol. 3 #47–49, tpb, 392 pages, 2018)
 All issues of the "Checkout" crossover — Checkmate vol. 2 #13–15 and The Outsiders vol. 3 #47–49 — are co-written by Rucka and Judd Winick.
 Issues #17 and 21–25 are co-written by Rucka and Eric Trautmann.
The Question:
Crime Bible: Five Lessons of Blood #1–5 (with various artists, 2007–2008) collected as The Question: Five Books of Blood (hc, 128 pages, 2008, ; tpb, 2009)
Final Crisis: Revelations #1–5 (with Philip Tan, 2008–2009) collected as Final Crisis: Revelations (hc, 168 pages, 2009, ; tpb, 2010)
Detective Comics #854–865: "The Question: Pipeline" (with Cully Hamner, co-feature, 2009–2010) collected as The Question: Pipeline (tpb, 128 pages, 2011)
The Question #37 (co-written by Rucka and Dennis O'Neil, art by Denys Cowan, 2010) collected in Blackest Night: Rise of the Black Lanterns (hc, 256 pages, 2010, ; tpb, 2011)
Convergence: The Question #1–2 (with Cully Hamner, 2015) collected in Convergence: Flashpoint Book One (tpb, 272 pages, 2015)
Final Crisis Companion (tpb, 200 pages, 2009) includes:
Final Crisis: Resist (co-written by Rucka and Eric Trautmann, art by Ryan Sook and Marco Rudy, one-shot, 2008)
Final Crisis Secret Files: "The Words of Lilith, Chapter 13, Verses 31–41" (with Steve Lieber, co-feature in one-shot, 2009)
Action Comics #879–889: "Captain Atom" (script by James Robinson from a plot by Rucka and Robinson, art by CAFU, co-feature, 2009–2010)
American Vampire Anthology #1: "Portland, 1940" (with John Paul Leon, Vertigo, 2013) collected in American Vampire Volume 6 (hc, 144 pages, 2014, ; tpb, 2014)
Lois Lane: Enemy of the People (tpb, 304 pages, 2020) collects:
Superman: Leviathan Rising: "Looking for Clark" (with Mike Perkins, co-feature in one-shot, 2019)
Lois Lane #1–12 (with Mike Perkins, 2019–2020)

Marvel Comics
Titles published by Marvel include:
Marvel Knights: Black Widow — The Complete Collection (tpb, 224 pages, 2018) includes:
Black Widow vol. 2 #1–3 (co-written by Rucka and Devin K. Grayson, art by Scott Hampton, Marvel Knights, 2001)
Black Widow: Pale Little Spider #1–3 (with Igor Kordey, Marvel MAX, 2002)
Spider-Man:
Spider-Man's Tangled Web #4: "Severance Package" (with Eduardo Risso, anthology, 2001)
 Collected in Spider-Man's Tangled Web Volume 1 (tpb, 144 pages, 2002)
 Collected in Spider-Man's Tangled Web Omnibus (hc, 560 pages, 2017)
Spider-Man: Quality of Life #1–4 (with Scott Christian Sava, 2002) collected as Spider-Man: Quality of Life (tpb, 112 pages, 2002)
Elektra and Wolverine: The Redeemer #1–3 (with Yoshitaka Amano, 2002) collected as Elektra and Wolverine: The Redeemer (hc, 208 pages, 2002)
Ultimate Collection: Elektra by Greg Rucka (tpb, 384 pages, 2012) collects:
Elektra vol. 2 #7–22 (with Chuck Austen (#7–8), Joe Bennett (#9–10, 16–17), Carlo Pagulayan and Carlos Meglia (#19–20), 2002–2003)
Marvel Knights Double-Shot #3: "Trust" (with Greg Horn, anthology, 2002)
X-Men Unlimited #38: "Yartzeit" (with Darick Robertson, anthology, 2002) collected in New X-Men Companion (tpb, 432 pages, 2019)
Ultimate Daredevil and Elektra #1–4 (with Salvador Larroca, 2003) collected as Ultimate Daredevil and Elektra (tpb, 128 pages, 2003)
Marvel Double-Shot #4: "Man of Iron" (with Klaus Janson, anthology, 2003)
Wolverine vol. 3 #1–19 (with Darick Robertson and Leandro Fernández (#7–11), 2003–2004) collected as Ultimate Collection: Wolverine by Greg Rucka (tpb, 384 pages, 2012)
Daredevil vol. 2 #107–110 (co-written by Rucka and Ed Brubaker, art by Michael Lark, 2008) collected in Ultimate Collection: Daredevil by Ed Brubaker and Michael Lark Volume 3 (tpb, 384 pages, 2012)
I am an Avenger #2: "Post-Mortem" (with Michael Lark, anthology, 2010) collected in We are the Avengers (tpb, 120 pages, 2011)
Punisher:
The Punisher vol. 9 (with Marco Checchetto, Matthew Clark + Matthew Southworth (#6), Michael Lark (#7), Mirko Colak (#9 and 11) and Mico Suayan (#13–14), 2011–2012) collected as:
 The Punisher by Greg Rucka Volume 1 (collects #1–5, hc, 136 pages, 2012, ; tpb, 2012)
 Includes the "Tingling" short story (art by Max Fiumara) from Spider-Island: I Love New York City (one-shot, 2011)
 The Punisher by Greg Rucka Volume 2 (collects #6–10, tpb, 208 pages, 2012)
 Includes Avenging Spider-Man #6 (co-written by Rucka and Mark Waid, art by Marco Checchetto, 2012)
 The Punisher by Greg Rucka Volume 3 (collects #11–16, tpb, 128 pages, 2013)
Punisher: War Zone vol. 3 #1–5 (with Carmine Di Giandomenico, 2012–2013) collected as Punisher: Enter the War Zone (tpb, 112 pages, 2013)
Cyclops #1–5 (with Russell Dauterman and Carmen Carnero (#4–5), 2014) collected as Cyclops: Starstruck (tpb, 112 pages, 2014) 
Star Wars: Shattered Empire #1–4 (with Marco Checchetto, 2015) collected as Journey to Star Wars: The Force Awakens — Shattered Empire (tpb, 136 pages, 2015, ; hc, 2016)
Captain America: Sam Wilson #7: "Pas de Deux" (with Mike Perkins, co-feature, 2016) collected in Captain America: Sam Wilson — The Complete Collection Volume 2 (tpb, 504 pages, 2021)

Image Comics
Titles published by Image include:
Felon #1–4 (of 6) (with Matthew Clark, Minotaur Press, 2001–2002)
Lazarus (with Michael Lark):
Lazarus (2013–2017) collected as:
 The First Collection (collects #1–9 and the 4-page digital preview, hc, 245 pages, 2014)
 The Second Collection (collects #10–21, hc, 320 pages, 2016)
 The Third Collection (includes #22–26, hc, 344 pages, 2019)
 Also collects the 6-issue spin-off limited series Lazarus X+66 (2017–2018)
 Issue #1 is co-written by Rucka and Eric Trautmann, art by Steve Lieber.
 Issue #2 is co-written by Rucka and Aaron Duran, art by Mack Chater.
 Issue #3 is co-written by Rucka and Neal Bailey, art by Justin Greenwood.
 Issue #4 is co-written by Rucka and Eric Trautmann, art by Alitha Martinez.
 Issue #5 is co-written by Rucka and Eric Trautmann, art by Bilquis Evely.
 Issue #6 is co-written by Rucka and Eric Trautmann, art by Tristan Jones.
Lazarus #27–28: "Fracture (prelude)" (2018)
Lazarus: Risen (2019–ongoing) collected as:
 Lazarus: Fracture I (collects #1–3, tpb, 152 pages, 2020)
 Lazarus: Fracture II (collects #4–7, tpb, 144 pages, 2022)
Black Magick (with Nicola Scott, 2015–ongoing) collected as:
Awakening I (collects #1–5, tpb, 128 pages, 2016)
Awakening II (collects #6–11, tpb, 136 pages, 2018)
Ascension I (collects #12–16, tpb, 136 pages, 2021)
The Old Guard (with Leandro Fernández):
The Old Guard #1–5 (2017) collected as The Old Guard: Opening Fire (tpb, 160 pages, 2017)
The Old Guard: Force Multiplied #1–5 (2019–2020) collected as The Old Guard: Force Multiplied (tpb, 128 pages, 2020)
The Old Guard: Tales Through Time #1–6 (anthology, 2021) collected as The Old Guard: Tales Through Time (tpb, 176 pages, 2021)
 Issue #1 featured "My Mother's Axe" (written by Rucka, art by Leandro Fernández) and "Zanzibar and Other Harbors" (written by Andrew Wheeler, drawn by Jacopo Camagni)
 Issue #2 featured "Bonsai Shokunin" (written by Kelly Sue DeConnick, drawn by Valentine De Landro) and "Strong Medicine" (written by Eric Trautmann, drawn by Mike Henderson)
 Issue #3 featured "Passchendaele" (written by Brian Michael Bendis, drawn by Michael Avon Oeming) and "Lacus Solitudinis" (written by Dave Walker and Robert Mackenzie, drawn by Justin Greenwood)
 Issue #4 featured "How to Make a Ghost Town" (written by Matt Fraction, drawn by Steve Lieber) and "Love Letters" (written by David F. Walker, drawn by Matthew Clark)
 Issue #5 featured "An Old Soul" (written by Jason Aaron, drawn by Rafael Albuquerque) and "Never Gets Old" (written by Alejandro Arbona, drawn by Kano)
 Issue #6 featured "Many Happy Returns" (written by Vita Ayala, drawn by Nicola Scott) and "The Bear" (written by Rucka, art by Leandro Fernández)
The Old Guard: Fade Away

Other publishers
Titles published by various American publishers include:
Adventures @ eBay (co-written by Rucka and Jen Van Meter, art by Judd Winick, one-shot, eBay Publishing, 2000)
Knights of the Dinner Table: Hackmasters of Everknight #7 (with Manny Vega, Kenzer & Company, 2001)
Lady Sabre and the Pirates of the Ineffable Aether (with Rick Burchett, webcomic, 2011–2016)
Dark Horse:
Veil #1–5 (with Toni Fejzula, 2014) collected as Veil (hc, 136 pages, 2015)
Dragon Age: Magekiller #1–5 (with Carmen Carnero, 2015–2016) collected as Dragon Age: Magekiller (tpb, 120 pages, 2016)
Call of Duty: Black Ops 4 #10: "Battery" (with Vincenzo Cucca, free digital comic, Activision, 2018) collected in Call of Duty: Black Ops 4 — The Official Comic Collection (hc, 240 pages, 2019)

References

External links
 

Rucka, Greg
Rucka, Greg